Depression may refer to:

Mental health
 Depression (mood), a state of low mood and aversion to activity
 Mood disorders characterized by depression are commonly referred to as simply depression, including:
 Dysthymia, also known as persistent depressive disorder
 Major depressive disorder, also known as clinical depression

Economics
 Economic depression, a sustained, long-term downturn in economic activity in one or more economies
 Great Depression, a severe economic depression during the 1930s, commonly referred to as simply the Depression
 Long Depression, an economic depression during 1873–96, known at the time as the Great Depression

Biology
 Depression (kinesiology), an anatomical term of motion, refers to downward movement, the opposite of elevation
 Depression (physiology), a reduction in a biological variable or the function of an organ
 Central nervous system depression, physiological depression of the central nervous system that can result in loss of consciousness

Earth science
 Depression (geology), a landform sunken or depressed below the surrounding area
 Depression (weather), an area of low atmospheric pressure characterized by rain and unstable weather